Richard James Oglesby (July 25, 1824April 24, 1899) was an American soldier and Republican politician from Illinois,   The town of Oglesby, Illinois, is named in his honor, as is an elementary school situated in the Auburn Gresham neighborhood of Chicago's south side.

He served in the United States Army during the Mexican–American War of 1846–47, and after the war became a prospector during the California Gold Rush and was elected to the Illinois General Assembly. During the American Civil War, Oglesby volunteered for the Union Army and rose to the rank of major general, serving in the Western Theater; he left the army when he was elected Governor of Illinois in 1864.

Early years
Oglesby was born in Floydsburg, Oldham County, Kentucky. He was orphaned and moved to live with his uncle in Decatur, Illinois in 1836, where he worked as a farmhand and carpenter.

Mexican–American War
With the outbreak of the Mexican–American War, he enlisted as a 1st Lieutenant in Company C, 4th Illinois Volunteer Infantry Regiment  taking part in the battles of Veracruz and Cerro Gordo "where his regiment almost captured Mexican President General Santa Anna, but they had to settle for his cork leg, carriage and $20,000 in gold".

He might have participated in what may have been the first baseball game ever played outside the U.S., at the end of April 1847, a few days after the Battle of Cerro Gordo, "with the wooden leg captured (by the Fourth Illinois regiment) from General Santa Anna".

Entry into politics
He studied at Louisville Law School in 1848, but traveled to California for the gold rush in 1849, where he tried his hand at gold mining. After two years of traveling in Europe, he returned to Illinois in 1851   Oglesby was one of the earliest advocates for Abraham Lincoln's nomination as the 1860 Presidential candidate of the Republican Party; it may have been he who applied the moniker "Railsplitter" to Lincoln.

Civil War

At the start of the Civil War, Oglesby was appointed colonel of the 8th Illinois Volunteer Infantry Regiment. He was a well-liked commander, receiving the moniker "Uncle Dick" from his troops. He commanded his brigade at the battles of Fort Henry and Fort Donelson and soon after was promoted to the rank of brigadier general. He commanded troops during the Siege of Corinth. Oglesby sustained severe injuries in the Battle of Corinth in 1862 and was elevated to the status of major general that same year.

After a brief period of recovery, Oglesby resumed military service in 1863. However, at the request of Abraham Lincoln, he abandoned his commission in 1864, successfully running for Illinois governor on the Republican ticket.

He was present in the room at the Petersen House when President Abraham Lincoln died on April 15, 1865.

Illinois politics

Oglesby first served as governor of Illinois from 1865 to 1869. During his tenure as governor, he advocated improving the quality of care of the mentally ill and for other groups of disabled citizens. He also signed legislation expanding the State Hospital system from one campus to three.  There is a statue of Richard J. Oglesby in Lincoln Park, Chicago.

His son, John G. Oglesby, was a two time Lieutenant Governor of Illinois.

See also

List of American Civil War generals (Union)

Notes

References
 Eicher, John H., and David J. Eicher. Civil War High Commands. Stanford, CA: Stanford University Press, 2001. .
 Warner, Ezra J. Generals in Blue: Lives of the Union Commanders. Baton Rouge: Louisiana State University Press, 1964. .

Further reading
 Plummer, Mark A. Lincoln's Rail Splitter: Governor Richard J. Oglesby. Urbana: University of Illinois Press, 2001. .
 Townsend, George Alfred. The Life, Crime and Capture of John Wilkes Booth. New York: Dick & Fitzgerald, 1865. .

External links
 
 Richard Oglesby Home in Decatur, Illinois

1824 births
1899 deaths
American people of Scottish descent
Republican Party Illinois state senators
Republican Party governors of Illinois
People from Decatur, Illinois
People from Elkhart, Illinois
People from Oldham County, Kentucky
People of Illinois in the American Civil War
Republican Party United States senators from Illinois
Union Army generals
People of the California Gold Rush
Union (American Civil War) state governors
19th-century American politicians